Richard fitz Gilbert (before 1035–), 1st feudal baron of Clare in Suffolk, was a Norman lord who participated in the Norman conquest of England in 1066, and was styled "de Bienfaite", "de Clare", and of "Tonbridge" from his holdings.

Biography
Richard was the son of Gilbert, Count of Brionne in Normandy (Fitz was a variant spelling of the Norman filz, French fils, signifying "son of"). Gilbert was a guardian of the young duke William and when Gilbert was killed by Ralph de Wacy in 1040, his two older sons Richard and Gilbert fled to Flanders. On his later return to Normandy Richard was rewarded with the lordship of Bienfaite and Orbec in Normandy. In 1066, Richard came into England with his kinsman William the Conqueror, and received from him great advancement in honour and possessions.

The Dictionary of National Biography and other sources are vague and sometimes contradictory about when the name de Clare came into common usage, but what we do know is that Richard fitz Gilbert (of Tonbridge), the earliest identifiable progenitor of the family, is once referred to as Richard of Clare in the Suffolk return of the Domesday Book.

Rewards
He was rewarded with 176 manors in England, including the right to build castles at Clare in Suffolk, caput of his feudal barony, and at Tonbridge in Kent. Some contemporaneous and later sources called him Earl of Clare, though many modern sources view the title as a "styled title".

He served as Joint Chief Justiciar in William's absence, and played a major part in suppressing the revolt of 1075.

Rebel baron
On the Conqueror's death, Richard and other great Norman barons, including Odo of Bayeux, Robert, Count of Mortain, and Geoffrey of Coutances, led a rebellion against the rule of William Rufus in order to place Robert Curthose on the throne. However,  most Normans in England remained loyal. William Rufus and his army successfully attacked the rebel strongholds at Tonbridge, Pevensey and Rochester.

Death and succession
He was buried in St. Neot's Priory in 1091. His widow was still living in 1113. His lands were inherited by his son, Gilbert fitz Richard.

Marriage
Richard married Rohese Giffard, daughter of Walter Giffard, Lord of Longueville and Agnes Flaitel, and they had at least the following children:
Roger fitz Richard de Clare, received Norman lands and d. 1131. Wife unknown, daughter Joanna married Gilbert de Neville.
Gilbert fitz Richard, d. 1115, succeeded his father as Earl of Clare.
Walter de Clare, Lord of Nether Gwent, d. 1138.
Richard fitz Richard de Clare, Abbot of Ely.
Robert fitz Richard, Lord of Little Dunmow, Baron of Baynard, d. 1136.
Godfrey
Alice (or Adeliza) de Clare, d. 1138. m. Walter Tirel.
Rohese de Clare, d. 1121, m. (ca. 1088), Eudo Dapifer.
Isabel de Clare, d. 1088, m. Humphrey d'Isle.
Avice de Clare, m. Robert de Stafford / Tosny.

Notes and references

Notes

References

Sources

11th-century births
1090s deaths
Year of birth unknown
Year of death uncertain
Normans in England
Norman warriors
Bush family
Richard
People from St Neots
People from Tonbridge
People from Clare, Suffolk
Devon Domesday Book tenants-in-chief